The Cold Spring River is a  mountain stream in Rockingham County in the U.S. state of Virginia. It is a tributary of the German River, the principal source of the North Fork Shenandoah River. Via the Shenandoah River, the Cold Spring River is part of the Potomac River watershed.

See also
List of rivers of Virginia

References

USGS Hydrologic Unit Map - State of Virginia (1974)

Rivers of Virginia
Tributaries of the Shenandoah River
Rivers of Rockingham County, Virginia